Love Monster may refer to:

 Love Monster (album), an album by Amy Shark
 Love Monster (EP), an EP by Monster Magnet
 Love Monster (manga), by Riko Miyagi
 Love Monster (TV series), a children's television show
 Love Monster, a series of books by Rachel Bright